General Alvear is a name that makes reference to the general Carlos María de Alvear. It can also refer to:
General Alvear, Buenos Aires
General Alvear, Mendoza
General Alvear Partido, Buenos Aires
General Alvear Department, Corrientes
General Alvear Department, Mendoza